Sergey Soukhanov (4 December 1930 – 1986) was a Soviet middle-distance runner. He competed in the men's 1500 metres at the 1956 Summer Olympics.

References

1930 births
1986 deaths
Athletes (track and field) at the 1956 Summer Olympics
Soviet male middle-distance runners
Olympic athletes of the Soviet Union
Place of birth missing